Maurice Solomon Miller (16 August 1920 – 30 October 2001) was a British Labour Party politician who was Member of Parliament (MP) for Glasgow Kelvingrove from 1964 to 1974 and for East Kilbride from 1974 to 1987.

Raised in Glasgow, Miller was educated at Shawlands Academy before going on to study at the University of Glasgow. He became a medical practitioner and a councillor on Glasgow Corporation from 1950. He was Bailie 1954 to 1957.

Elected at the 1964 general election, Miller was a government whip from 1968 to 1969. He stood down as MP for Glasgow Kelvingrove at the February 1974 general election and instead stood successfully for East Kilbride at the election. He was the chair of Poale Zion's Scottish branch in the 1980s. He retired at the 1987 general election.

References

The Times Guide to the House of Commons, Times Newspapers Ltd, 1983

External links 
 

1920 births
2001 deaths
People educated at Shawlands Academy
Alumni of the University of Glasgow
Councillors in Glasgow
Scottish Labour councillors
Scottish Labour MPs
UK MPs 1964–1966
UK MPs 1966–1970
UK MPs 1970–1974
UK MPs 1974
UK MPs 1974–1979
UK MPs 1979–1983
UK MPs 1983–1987
Members of the Parliament of the United Kingdom for Glasgow constituencies
Jewish British politicians